Robert Taylor McCallum (born 1940) is a Scottish former footballer who played for Motherwell, mainly as a left back. He was the club's 'player of the year' in the 1962–63 season.

He was selected once for the Scottish Football League XI, in 1966.

References

1940 births
Living people
Footballers from Motherwell
Association football fullbacks
Scottish footballers
Bellshill Athletic F.C. players
Motherwell F.C. players
Scottish Junior Football Association players
Scottish Football League players
Scottish Football League representative players